East Lindsey was a county constituency based on the East Lindsey local government district of Lincolnshire.  It returned one Member of Parliament (MP)  to the House of Commons of the Parliament of the United Kingdom.

The constituency was created for the 1983 general election, and abolished for the 1997 general election.

History

Boundaries 
The District of East Lindsey wards of Alford, Burgh-le-Marsh, Chapel St Leonards, Coningsby, Fotherby, Friskney, Frithville, Grimoldby, Halton Holegate, Hogsthorpe, Holton-le-Clay, Hundleby, Ingoldmells, Legbourne, Mablethorpe, Mareham-le-Fen, Marshchapel, New Leake, North Holme, North Somercotes, North Thoresby, Partney, Priory, St Clements, St James, St Margarets, St Marys, St Michaels, Scarbrough, Seacroft, Sibsey, Spilsby, Sutton and Trusthorpe, Tattershall, Tetford, Tetney, Theddlethorpe St Helen, Trinity, Wainfleet, Willoughby with Sloothby, Winthorpe, and Withern with Stain.

The seaside resort of Skegness was included in the constituency.

Members of Parliament

Elections

Notes and references 

Parliamentary constituencies in Lincolnshire (historic)
Constituencies of the Parliament of the United Kingdom established in 1983
Constituencies of the Parliament of the United Kingdom disestablished in 1997